Vrelo is a village located in the municipality of Ub, western Serbia. According to the 2011 census, the village has a population of 1,503 inhabitants.

Trivia
One of the natives of Vrelo is football player Nemanja Matić, who is helping his native village in various ways.

Gallery

References

External links

Populated places in Kolubara District